Jawahar Navodaya Vidyalaya, Solan or locally known as JNV Kunihar is a boarding, co-educational school in Solan district of Himachal Pradesh state in India. Navodaya Vidyalayas are funded by the Indian Ministry of Human Resources Development and administered  by Navodaya Vidyalaya Smiti, an autonomous body under the ministry.

History 
The school was established in 1993, and is a part of Jawahar Navodaya Vidyalaya schools. The permanent campus of this school is located near Kunihar, Solan. This school is administered and monitored by Chandigarh regional office of Navodaya Vidyalaya Smiti.

Admission 
Admission to JNV Solan at class VI level is made through selection test conducted by Navodaya Vidyalaya Smiti. The information about test is disseminated and advertised in the district by the office of Solan district magistrate (Collector), who is also chairperson of Vidyalya Management Committee.

Affiliations 
JNV Solan is affiliated to Central Board of Secondary Education with affiliation number 640010, following the curriculum prescribed by CBSE.

See also 

 List of JNV schools
 Jawahar Navodaya Vidyalaya, Sirmaur
 Jawahar Navodaya Vidyalaya, Bilaspur
 Jawahar Navodaya Vidyalaya, Anantnag

References

External links 

 Official Website of JNV Solan

High schools and secondary schools in Himachal Pradesh
Solan
Educational institutions established in 1993
1993 establishments in Himachal Pradesh
Solan district